Chicago and North Western Depot and variations may refer to the following stations used by the Chicago and North Western Railway:

Illinois 
 Chicago and Northwestern Depot (Sycamore, Illinois), listed on the National Register of Historic Places in DeKalb County, Illinois, located on the line between Belvidere and Spring Valley
 DeKalb station, in DeKalb County, Illinois, located on the main line between Chicago and Omaha
 Rochelle station, in Ogle County, Illinois, located on the main line between Chicago and Omaha
 Wayne station (Illinois), in Du Page County, Illinois, located on the branch line between West Chicago and Freeport
 East Rockford station, in Winnebago County, Illinois, located on the branch line between West Chicago and Freeport
 Freeport station (Illinois), in Stephenson County, Illinois, located on the branch line between West Chicago and Freeport
 Hebron station (Illinois), in McHenry County, Illinois, located on the line between Kenosha and Rockford
 Alden station, in McHenry County, Illinois, located on the line between Kenosha and Rockford
 East Dundee station, in Kane County, Illinois, located on the line between Elgin and Crystal Lake
 Chicago and Northwestern Depot (Wilmette, Illinois), listed on the National Register of Historic Places in Cook County, Illinois, located on the commuter line between Chicago and Kenosha
 Norwood Park station, listed on the National Register of Historic Places in Chicago, Illinois, located on the commuter line between Chicago and Harvard

Iowa 

 Algona Depot
 Ames Depot
 Beaver Depot
 Belle Plaine Depot
 Breda Depot
 Calamus Depot
 Carroll Depot
 Center Junction Depot
 Clinton Depot, located on the main line between Chicago and Omaha
 Council Bluffs Depot
 Denison Depot
 Ellsworth Depot
 Harlan Depot
 Hawarden Depot
 Ida Grove Depot
 Lake City Depot
 Lake View Depot
 Lone Rock Depot
 Lowden Depot
 Onawa Depot
 Owasa Depot
 Pisgah Depot
 Ricketts Depot
 Sac City Depot
 Stanhope Depot
 Story City Depot
 Stratford Depot
 Traer Depot
 Wall Lake Depot

Michigan 

 Iron Mountain Depot
 Ironwood Depot - listed on the National Register of Historic Places in Gogebic County, Michigan
 Norway Depot
 Stager Depot
 Wilson Depot

Minnesota 

 Canby Depot
 Claremont Depot
 Delhi Depot
 Fairmont Depot
 Hendricks Depot
 Ivanhoe Depot
 Lamberton Depot
 Lucan Depot - listed on the National Register of Historic Places in Redwood County, Minnesota
 Mankato Union Depot
 Marshall Depot - listed on the National Register of Historic Places in Lyon County, Minnesota
 Minneopa Depot
 New Ulm Depot - listed on the National Register of Historic Places in Brown County, Minnesota
 Owatonna Depot
 Porter Depot
 Revere Depot
 Sleepy Eye Depot - listed on the National Register of Historic Places in Brown County, Minnesota
 Tracy Depot
 Walnut Grove Depot
 Waseca Depot

South Dakota 

 Aberdeen Depot
 Alcester Depot
 Belle Fourche Depot
 Beresford Depot - listed on the National Register of Historic Places in Union County, South Dakota
 Brookings Depot - listed on the National Register of Historic Places in Brookings County, South Dakota
 Capa Depot
 Carthage Depot
 Castlewood Depot
 Clark Depot
 Conde Depot
 De Smet Depot
 Fort Pierre Depot
 Gettysburg Depot
 Harrold Depot
 Hecla Depot
 Hot Springs Depot
 Huron Depot
 Kampeska Depot
 Lake Preston Depot
 Midland Depot
 Miller Depot
 Miranda Depot
 Mission Hill Depot
 Redfield Depot - listed on the National Register of Historic Places in Spink County, South Dakota
 Ree Heights Depot
 St. Onge Depot
 Sturgis Depot
 Unityville Depot
 Vayland Depot
 Winner Depot
 Wood Depot

Wisconsin 

 Antigo Depot
 Ashland Union Depot
 Baraboo Depot
 Clintonville Depot
 Cuba City Depot
 Cudahy Depot
 Deerbrook Depot
 Dodgeville Depot
 Eagle River Depot
 Eau Claire Depot, a demolished station located on the mainline between Wyeville and Minneapolis and the southern terminus of the line between Eau Claire and Duluth
 Eland Depot
 Elroy Depot
 Evansville Depot
 Fond du Lac Depot, located on the mainline between Milwaukee and Green Bay via Fond Du Lac and the northern terminus of the branch line between Janesville and Fond Du Lac
 Footville Depot
 Grand Marsh Depot
 Green Bay Depot
 Jefferson Depot
 Kendalls Depot
 Kenosha Station
 Lake Geneva Depot, a demolished station in Walworth County, Wisconsin, located on the line between Crystal Lake and Williams Bay
 Lake Mills Depot
 LaRue Depot
 Lyndhurst Depot
 Madison Depot
 Malone Depot
 Manitowoc Depot
 Marinette Depot
 Marion Depot
 Mattoon Depot
 Mercer Depot
 Monico Junction Depot
 Neenah Depot
 New London Depot
 Niagara Depot
 Pell Lake Depot
 Plymouth Depot
 Racine Depot
 Reedsburg Depot, listed on the National Register of Historic Places in Sauk County, Wisconsin, located on the main line between Chicago and Minneapolis via Madison
 Rhinelander Depot
 Ridgeway Depot
 Rock Springs Depot
 Sheboygan Depot
 South Milwaukee Depot
 Sparta Depot
 Sussex Depot
 Three Lakes Depot
 Tunnel City Depot
 Watertown Depot, listed on the National Register of Historic Places in Jefferson County, Wisconsin, located on the line between Janesville and Fond Du Lac
 Waukesha Depot, listed on the National Register of Historic Places, located on the mainline between Madison and Milwaukee
 Waunakee Depot
 Wausau Depot
 Wautoma Depot
 West Bend Depot

Wyoming 
 Chicago and Northwestern Railroad Depot (Powder River, Wyoming), listed on the National Register of Historic Places in Natrona County, Wyoming